Touch and Go is a British jazz pop musical ensemble. Their most notable singles include "Would You...?", "Straight to...Number One", "So Hot", and "Tango in Harlem".

Career
In October 1998, "Would You...?", a track marked by its distinctive sampling of a woman's voice saying "I've noticed you around / I find you very attractive / Would you go to bed with me?", reached #3 in the UK Singles Chart. It became a hit in Europe, particularly in Eastern Europe where the ensemble toured extensively. "Would You...?" has been included on such television show soundtracks as the American G String Divas and the British series As If. The track has also been sampled for San Pellegrino, Carlsberg, and Nokia advertisements. It was played in Miss World 1998 during the runway pass of a group of contestants, and also in Miss Universe 2002, this last one a different version of the song during the swimsuit competition. The lyrics were inspired by questions originally used as part of a psychological study conducted in 1978 by Elaine Hatfield and Russell D. Clark.

"Straight... to Number One" was also featured in some advertisements, including one for Apple Computer's iTunes.  The song was also featured in the first season of the American version of Queer As Folk.

Touch and Go were popular in Eastern Europe, especially in Russia, playing some fifty concerts a year. Since 2003, they travelled all major cities in Russia and ex-USSR countries from Moscow to Vladivostok. The band is being represented in the region by IKON exclusively.

Their record producer, David Lowe, is the composer of all BBC News music since 1998.

On 13 November 2011, they appeared as musical guests on X Factor (Romania).

Ensemble

Members
 Vanessa Lancaster – vocals
 James Lynch – trumpet, instruments

Producers
 David Lowe
 Charlie Gillett
 Gordon Nelki

Discography

Albums
I Find You Very Attractive (1999)

Singles
"Would You...?" (1998) - UK No. 3
"Straight... to Number One" (1999)
"So Hot" (2000)
"Tango in Harlem" (2001)

References

External links
 
 
 

Acid jazz ensembles
English jazz ensembles
Musical groups from London